More Than a Match for the Navy (Swedish: Flottans överman) is a 1958 Swedish comedy film directed by Stig Olin and starring Nils Poppe, Harriet Andersson and Yvonne Lombard. It was part of a series of films featuring Poppe the recurring character Fabian Bom. The film's sets were designed by the art director P.A. Lundgren. It was shot in Eastmancolor at the Råsunda Studios in Stockholm and on location in Barcelona and Benicarló in Spain.

Synopsis
Fabian Bom is working for the Swedish export council and is sent abroad on a navy cruiser to promote Spanish businesses. His fiancée Gullan is irritated that he is married to his work and follows him to Barcelona. He also encounters the free-spirited Linnea. In Barclona he meets Vera, the Swedish wife of a local businessmen. A variety of complications ensue in which Bom is pursued by an irate bullfighter.

Cast
 Nils Poppe as Fabian Bom
 Harriet Andersson as 	Linnea Berg
 Yvonne Lombard as 	Gullan Polander
Sigge Fürst as 	Karlsson
 Git Gay as 	Vera Cavalcante
 Gösta Bernhard as Eduardo Cavalcante
 Sven-Eric Gamble as 	Halland
 Georg Adelly as Sjöman
 Sten Gester as 	Harry Sandberg
 Fritiof Billquist as 	Kapten Reling
 Rolf Botvid as 	Löjtnant
 Jaime Avellán as 	Diego Manolo
 Einar Axelsson as 	Rossling
 Svea Holst as 	Fröken Svensson
 Bellan Roos as Spansk affärskvinna
 Michèle Apfelbaum as 	Flicka på Los Caracoles
 Sten Ardenstam as 	Manolos hejduk
 Tore Bengtsson as 	Manolos hejduk
 Yvonne Brosset as 	Dansare på Los Caracoles
 Göthe Grefbo as 	Kypare
 Birgitta Grönwald as 	Flicka på Los Caracoles
 Siv Järrel as 	Flygvärdinna
 Davyla Lewenbruk as 	Flicka på Los Caracoles
 Sven Melin as 	Gäst på Los Caracoles
 Rune Ottoson as 	Manolos hejduk
 Torsten Sjöholm as 	Manolos hejduk
 Georg Skarstedt as Hovmästare på Los Caracoles
 Alexander von Baumgarten as 	Los Caracoles ägare
 Chris Wahlström as Servitris på Los Caracoles

References

Bibliography 
 Qvist, Per Olov & von Bagh, Peter. Guide to the Cinema of Sweden and Finland. Greenwood Publishing Group, 2000.

External links 
 

1958 films
Swedish comedy films
1958 comedy films
1950s Swedish-language films
Films directed by Stig Olin
Seafaring films
Films shot in Barcelona
Films set in Barcelona
1950s Swedish films